This is an incomplete list of deputy lieutenants of Gloucestershire.

 Benjamin St John Ackers
 John Aldam Aizlewood
 Charles Allen (Stroud MP)
 Sir Charles Allfrey
 Sir Michael Angus
 Allen Bathurst, Lord Apsley
 Sir Clement Armitage
 Thomas Ashton, 2nd Baron Ashton of Hyde
 Benjamin Bathurst (politician, born 1872)
 Henry Bathurst, 8th Earl Bathurst
 Seymour Bathurst, 7th Earl Bathurst
 Sir Thomas Bazley, 1st Baronet
 Henry Somerset, 8th Duke of Beaufort
 Henry Somerset, 9th Duke of Beaufort
 Sally Byng
 Sir Egbert Cadbury
 Alfred Carpenter
 Sir Charles Cave, 1st Baronet
 Sir Stephen Cave
 Sir William Davis
 Sir James Buller East, 2nd Baronet
 Sir Henry Elwes
 Lewis Fry
 Henry Goodeve
 Arthur Goschen
 Michael Hicks Beach, 1st Earl St Aldwyn
 Edward Holland (MP)
 Sir James Horlick, 1st Baronet
 Sir Francis Howard
 Sir Stafford Howard
 Manley James (VC)
 Sir Anthony Kershaw
 Sir John Kiszely
 Percival Marling
 Tony Mason (RAF officer)
 Thomas Master (died 1710)
 Charles James Monk
 Henry Reynolds-Moreton, Lord Moreton
 Ashley Ponsonby
 Algernon Freeman-Mitford, 1st Baron Redesdale
 Richard Bevan (Royal Navy officer)
 Francis Richards (diplomat)
 Gordon Richardson, Baron Richardson of Duntisbourne
 Brian Robertson, 1st Baron Robertson of Oakridge
 Michael Hicks Beach, 2nd Earl St Aldwyn
 John Scudamore, 2nd Viscount Scudamore
 Phil Vickery (rugby union) (2015)
 David Walker (RAF administrative officer)
 Evelyn Webb-Carter
 William Wedderburn
 James Charteris, 13th Earl of Wemyss
 Steven West
 David Fane, 15th Earl of Westmorland
 Neville Wigram, 2nd Baron Wigram
 Herbert Charles Woodcock

References 

Deputy Lieutenants of Gloucestershire